98 may refer to:

 98 (number)
 Windows 98, a Microsoft operating system

Years
 98 BC
 AD 98
 1798
 1898
 1998
 2098

See also
 Californium (atomic number), a chemical element
 98 Degrees (98°), a band
 Madden NFL 98, a video game